A Woman Like You may refer to:
 A Woman Like You (1933 film), a German comedy film
 A Woman Like You (1939 film), a German romance film
"A Woman Like You" (Johnny Reid song), 2009
"A Woman Like You" (Lee Brice song), 2011